Los ricos también lloran (English: The Rich Also Cry) is a Mexican television series produced by W Studios for TelevisaUnivision. It aired on Las Estrellas from 21 February 2022 to 13 May 2022. It is a reboot based on the 1979 Mexican telenovela of the same name, and the fourth production of the Fábrica de sueños franchise. The series stars Sebastián Rulli and Claudia Martín.

Plot 
Mariana (Claudia Martín) is a poor young woman who is left alone in the world and must make her way in life. When she saves the life of Alberto Salvatierra (Guillermo García Cantú), in gratitude he takes her to his house where she meets Luis Alberto Salvatierra (Sebastián Rulli) and they fall deeply in love. To carry on their relationship, Mariana will have to overcome obstacles of social class, education and traumas, while being surrounded by ambitions and betrayals. When Mariana and Luis Alberto are able to realize their love, life will bring them a tragedy: the kidnapping of their son.

Cast

Main 
 Sebastián Rulli as Luis Alberto Salvatierra
 Claudia Martín as Mariana Villarreal
 Fabiola Guajardo as Soraya Montenegro
 Azela Robinson as Elena Suárez
 Alejandra Barros as Daniela Montesinos
 Víctor González as León Alfaro
 Lorena Graniewicz as Britny Chantal Domínguez
 Diego Klein as Santiago Hinojosa
 Arturo Barba as Víctor Millán
 Rubén Sanz as Uriel López
 Thali García as Sofía Mandujano
 Antonio Fortier as Felipe Castillo
 José Luis Franco as Commander Eduardo Becerra
 Mimi Morales as Guadalupe Morales
 Mario Morán as Diego Fernández
 Michelle Jurado as Patricia Luna Castillo
 Dobrina Cristeva as Socorro "Coco" Buendía
 Paola Toyos as Matilde Vélez
 Erik Díaz as Polo Hernández
 Axel Alcántara as Jhony Domínguez
 Sergio Reynoso as Ramíro Domínguez
 Henry Zakka as Father Guillermo
 Dalilah Polanco as Chabela Pérez
 Guillermo García Cantú as Alberto Salvatierra

Recurring and guest stars 

 Luis Gatica as Osvaldo Valdivia
 Darío Ripoll as Gregorio
 Arturo Carmona as Pedro Villareal García
 Rodolfo Arias as Dr. Murillo
 Irineo Álvarez as Alfonso Romano
 Lupita Lara as Nana Trini
 Fernando Banda as Casero
 Carlos Moreno Cravioto as Márquez
 Ricky Gutiérrez as Jesús Camargo
 Paulina de Alba as Constanza
 Pamela Barri as Lizzy
 Sahit Sosa as Jaime
 Carla Suescun as Nayelli
 Héctor Salas as Matías Salvatierra Suárez
 Carlos Gatica as Emilio Campos
 Arturo García Tenorio as Javier
 Darwin as Toribio
 Andy Lo as Maikel Redondo
 Ariel López Padilla as Efraín Torres
 Claudia Silva as Naty
 César Valdivia as Manuel
 Ian Monterrubio as Edgar Castillo Luna
 Alexa Ordaz as Montse
 Hugo Catalán as Carlos
 Carilú Navarro as Chole
 Sachi Tamashiro as Dr. Altamira
 Valentina Delfín Cervantes as Julieta Fernández
 René Martínez as Forense
 María Fernanda García as Sandra
 León Peraza as Rafael Montenegro
 Cirilo Santiago Pérez as Salvador
 Víctor Baez as Marito
 Mayra Rojas as Yolanda
 Natasha Domínguez as Tamara
 Agustín Arana as Dr. Stramesi
 Sabrina Seara as Vivian
 Andrés Baida as Alberto "Betito" Salvatierra Villarreal / Tomás "Tomasito" Verón Ortega
 Estefi Merelles as Roberta Millan
 Israel Salmer as José Verón
 Magali Boysselle as Rita Ortega de Verón

Production 
In October 2018 the series was announced to be part of the Fábrica de sueños. In May 2021 the series was presented during the Univision upfront for the 2021–2022 television season. Filming began on 20 September 2021, the cast was announced on the same day. Filming ended on 2 March 2022.

Episodes

Reception

Ratings 
 
}}

Awards and nominations

Notes

References

External links 
 

2022 telenovelas
2022 Mexican television series debuts
2022 Mexican television series endings
2020s Mexican television series
Televisa telenovelas
Television series produced by W Studios
Mexican telenovelas
Spanish-language telenovelas